The West Delaware County Community School District, or West Delaware CCSD is a rural public school district based in Manchester, Iowa.  The district is completely within Delaware County, and serves the city of Manchester and surrounding areas, including the towns of Dundee, Greeley, Masonville, and Ryan.

Mascot 

The school's mascot is the Hank the Hawk. Their colors are Black and Orange.

Schools
The district operates three schools, all in Manchester:
Lambert Elementary School
West Delaware Middle School
West Delaware High School

West Delaware High School

Athletics
The Hawks compete in the WaMaC Conference in the following sports:

Baseball
Class 3A State Champions - 2007
Basketball (boys and girls)
Bowling (boys and girls)
Cross Country (boys and girls)
Football
Class 3A State Champions - 1991
Golf (boys and girls)
Soccer (boys and girls)
Softball
 Class 3A State Champions - 2007
Swimming (boys and girls)
Tennis (boys and girls)
Track and Field (boys and girls)
Volleyball
 2015 Class 4A State Champions
 2021 Class 3A State Champions
Wrestling 
 6-time Class 2A State Champions - 1991, 2013, 2019, 2020, 2021, 2022. The Hawks have won 4 straight state dual titles.

See also
List of school districts in Iowa
List of high schools in Iowa

References

External links
 West Delaware CCSD

Education in Delaware County, Iowa
School districts in Iowa